This is a list of social platforms with at least 100 million monthly active users. The list includes social networks, as well as online forums, photo and video sharing platforms, messaging and VoIP apps.

Integrated services

Notes

References

Internet-related lists